Szolnoki Olajbányász is a professional basketball team based in Szolnok, Hungary. The team also goes by the name of Olaj, which is a well-known nickname in the country. The club competes in the Hungarian League.

Established in 1959, it is one of the most successful teams in Hungarian basketball with eight Hungarian championships. Olaj has also won eight Hungarian Cup titles. The team's home arena is the Tiszaligeti Sportcsarnok.

History
The club was founded in 1959, and it has since developed into one of the most successful basketball teams in Hungary. Olaj has won four Hungarian National Championships, four Hungarian Cups since 1989 (the year when they earned a spot in the Hungarian 1st division).

In 2012, the club played the EuroChallenge Final Four where they were beaten by Beşiktaş Milangaz. For the 2012–13 season, Szolnoki Olaj was invited to join the Adriatic League. In 2014 they won the Hungarian Basketball Cup once again. Szolnok made the EuroChallenge Final Four for the second time made in 2014, and ended on the 4th place once again, after losing to Triumph Lyubertsy and Royal Halı Gaziantep.

Team

Current roster

Honours

Domestic competitions
Nemzeti Bajnokság I/A (National Championship of Hungary)
 Champions (8): 1990–91, 2006–07, 2010–11, 2011–12, 2013–14, 2014–15, 2015–16, 2017–18
 Runners-up (3): 1992–93, 1999–00, 2012–13
 Third place (2): 1994–95, 1997–98

Magyar Kupa (National Cup of Hungary)
 Winners (8): 2002, 2007, 2011, 2012, 2014, 2015, 2018, 2019
 Finalist (6): 1993, 1994, 1995, 2013, 2016, 2017

Notable players

Season by season

 Cancelled due to the COVID-19 pandemic in Hungary.

In European competition
Source: basketball.eurobasket.com
Participations in EuroCup: 2x
Participations in Champions League: 1x
Participations in FIBA Europe Cup: 3x
Participations in EuroChallenge: 4x
Participations in Korać Cup: 2x

References

External links
 
Team profile at eurobasket.com
Team profile for 2017 Basketball Champions League

Basketball teams in Hungary
Szolnok
Basketball teams established in 1959
1959 establishments in Hungary